Masi Maskanlu (also Romanized as Māsī Māskānlū; also known as Māsī Mūskānlū) is a village in Chenaran Rural District, in the Central District of Chenaran County, Razavi Khorasan Province, Iran. At the 2006 census, its population was 257, in 55 families.

References 

Populated places in Chenaran County